Infante Alfonso of Spain, Prince of the Two Sicilies, Duke of Calabria (30 November 1901 – 3 February 1964) was one of two claimants to the title of the head of the House of Bourbon-Two Sicilies from 1960 until his death in 1964. Alfonso was the son of Prince Carlos of Bourbon-Two Sicilies (1870–1949) and his wife, María de las Mercedes, Princess of Asturias (1880–1904). He was born and died in Madrid, Spain.

Alfonso's mother was María de las Mercedes, Princess of Asturias, but she died in childbirth in 1904. Alfonso XIII, King of Spain was unmarried at the time so as the Princess of the Asturias's eldest son, the young infante became heir-presumptive to the Spanish crown, though, unlike his mother, he never held the title of Prince of Asturias.  He was heir-presumptive until the birth of his cousin, Alfonso in 1907, to Alfonso XIII and Queen Victoria Eugenie.

Marriage and issue
Alfonso married Princess Alice of Bourbon-Parma (1917-2017), his second cousin, daughter of Elias, Duke of Parma and Piacenza and his wife Archduchess Maria Anna of Austria, on 16 April 1936 in Vienna, Austria. Alfonso and Alicia had three children:

Princess Teresa of Bourbon-Two Sicilies, Duchess of Salerno (born 6 February 1937), married to Íñigo Moreno y Arteaga, 1st Marquess of Laserna (formerly 11th Marquess of Laula, born 18 April 1934), with seven children:
Rodrigo Moreno y Borbón-Dos Sicilias (born 1 February 1962), married to Casilda Guerrero-Burgos y Fernández de Córdoba, 21st Duchess of Cardona (born 1982).
Alicia Moreno y Borbón-Dos Sicilias (born 6 June 1964), married to José Luis Hernández Eraso (born 1949), with two children:
Iñigo Hernández y Moreno (born 2000)
Alejandra Hernández y Moreno (born 2000)
Alfonso Moreno y Borbón-Dos Sicilias (19 October 1965 - 18 May 2018), married to Marta Calvo y Molezún (born ca. 1970), with two children
Beatriz Moreno y Borbón-Dos Sicilias (born 10 May 1967), married to Lucas Urquijo Fernández de Araoz, with two children
Fernando Moreno y Borbón-Dos Sicilias (8 July 1969 - 12 May 2011)
Clara Moreno y Borbón-Dos Sicilias (born 14 June 1971)
Delia Moreno y Borbón-Dos Sicilias (born 30 August 1972), married to Álvaro de Ledesma y Sanchiz (born 20 October 1962)
Infante Carlos, Duke of Calabria (16 January 1938 - 5 October 2015), married to Princess Anne of Orléans (born 4 December 1938), with five children:
Cristina de Borbón-Dos Sicilias y Orleáns (born 16 March 1966), married to Pedro López-Quesada y Fernández-Urrutia (born 26 July 1963), with two children
María Paloma de Borbón-Dos Sicilias y Orleáns (born 5 April 1967), married to Archduke Simeon of Austria (born 26 June 1959), with five children
Pedro de Borbón-Dos Sicilias, Duke of Calabria (born 16 October 1968), married to Sofía Landaluce y Melgarejo (born 23 November 1973), with seven children:
Jaime de Borbón-Dos Sicilias, Duke of Noto (born 26 June 1993)
Juan de Borbón-Dos Sicilias y Landaluce (born 18 April 2003)
Pablo de Borbón-Dos Sicilias y Landaluce (born 26 June 2004)
Pedro de Borbón-Dos Sicilias y Landaluce (born 3 January 2007)
Sofía de Borbón-Dos Sicilias y Landaluce (born 12 November 2008)
Blanca de Borbón-Dos Sicilias y Landaluce (born 7 April 2011)
María de Borbón-Dos Sicilias y Landaluce (born 21 April 2015)
Inés de Borbón-Dos Sicilias y Orleáns (born 20 April 1971), married to Michele Carrelli Palombi (born 13 November 1965), with two children
Victoria de Borbón-Dos Sicilias y Orleáns (born 24 May 1976), married to Markos Nomikos (born 29 October 1965), with four children

 Princess Inés of Bourbon-Two Sicilies, Duchess of Syracuse (born 18 February 1940), married to Luis de Morales y Aguado (born 8 October 1933 - 10 November 2000), with five children:
Isabel de Morales y Borbón-Dos Sicilias (born 10 April 1966), married to Joaquín Galán y Otamendi, with two children:
Carlota Galán y Borbón-Dos-Sicilias (born March 1998)
Inés Galán y Borbón-Dos-Sicilias (born 3 January 2000)
Eugenia de Morales y Borbón-Dos Sicilias (born 14 December 1967), married to Iñigo Valdenebro y García de Polavieja, with three children
Sonia de Morales y Borbón-Dos Sicilias (9 December 1969 – 26 July 2022), married to Alejandro García-Atance y Leurquin (born 1974), with two children
Manuel de Morales y Borbón-Dos Sicilias (born 16 December 1971), married to Emma Ruiz de Azcárate y García de Lomas, with two children
Mencía de Morales y Borbón-Dos Sicilias (born 25 November 1975)

Honours and arms

Orders and decorations 
 :
 Knight of the Distinguished Order of the Golden Fleece, 1 December 1901
 Grand Cross of the Royal and Distinguished Order of Charles III, with Collar, 1 December 1901
 Grand Cross of the Royal Order of Isabella the Catholic, 1 December 1901
 Knight of the Order of Alcántara, 13 April 1923

Heraldry

Ancestry

External links

References

1901 births
1964 deaths
Nobility from Madrid
Princes of Bourbon-Two Sicilies
Pretenders to the throne of the Kingdom of the Two Sicilies
Dukes of Calabria
Burials in the Pantheon of Infantes at El Escorial
Spanish Roman Catholics
20th-century Roman Catholics
Knights of the Golden Fleece of Spain
Knights Grand Cross of the Order of Isabella the Catholic
Knights of the Order of Alcántara